The Never Ending Tour is the popular name for Bob Dylan's endless touring schedule since June 7, 1988.

Background
The Never Ending Tour 1991 started with The Second Fastbreak Tour starting in late January. The tour started in the reverse of the original Fastbreak Tour, in the first tour Dylan started in North America and moved to Europe but in the 1991 tour Dylan started in Europe and finished in North America. The tour started in Zurich, Switzerland, Dylan's first concert in the country. The tour then moved through Belgium, the Netherlands and Northern Ireland. Dylan then performed an eight show residency at Hammersmith Odeon in London. This was the first time that Dylan had performed at the legendary Hammersmith Odeon. The tour finished on March 2 in Mexico City.

On April 19 Dylan started a seventeen-date concert tour of the United States. The tour started in New Orleans, Louisiana and came to an end May 12 in Amherst, Massachusetts.

Dylan returned to Europe in early June. The tour started with three concerts in Italy. On June 10 and 11 Bob performed two concerts in Yugoslavia, his first and last concerts there as the country would break–up the following year. Dylan then performed two concerts in Austria before performing six concerts in Germany. Dylan then performed two concerts in Stockholm, Sweden and then the tour came to an end with a performance at Kalvøya–Festivalen on June 28 and a performance at Midtfyns Festival the following day.

After finishing his European summer tour Dylan returned to North America to perform fourteen concerts in the United States and one in Canada. He then travelled to South America with the band to perform nine concerts, five of which were in Brazil, three in Argentina and one concert in Uruguay. Dylan continued his North American tour on October 24 in Corpus Christi, Texas. The tour continued through the Southern and Eastern United States coming to an end in Charlottesville, Virginia on November 20.

Shows

Festivals and other miscellaneous performances
This concert was a part of "Kalvøya-Festivalen"
This concert was a part of "Midtfyns Festival"
This concert was a part of "Great New York State Fair"

References

External links

BobLinks – Comprehensive log of concerts and set lists
Bjorner's Still on the Road – Information on recording sessions and performances

References

Bob Dylan concert tours
1991 concert tours